Hooker Glacier is a glacier on the east side of the Royal Society Range, draining northeast into Blue Glacier from the slopes of Mount Hooker. It was surveyed in 1957 by the New Zealand Blue Glacier Party of the Commonwealth Trans-Antarctic Expedition (1956–58) and named after Mount Hooker.

Glaciers of Victoria Land